Four Counties may refer to:

Siyi (Chinese: 四邑, 'Four Counties'), four former counties in the Pearl River Delta, China
Heart Four Counties, a British local radio station serving Bedfordshire, Buckinghamshire, Hertfordshire and Northamptonshire
Four Counties Ring, a canal ring in the English counties of Cheshire, Staffordshire, Shropshire and the West Midlands

See also
Four Countries